Modalistic Monarchianism, also known as Modalism or Oneness Christology, is a Christian theology upholding the oneness of God as well as the divinity of Jesus; as a form of Monarchianism, it stands in contrast with Trinitarianism. Modalistic Monarchianism considers God to be one while working through or existing as the different "modes" or "manifestations" of God the Father, God the Son, and God the Holy Spirit, without limiting his modes or manifestations.

In this view, all the godhead is understood to have dwelt in Jesus from the incarnation as a manifestation of Yahweh of the Old Testament. The terms "Father" and "Son" are then used to describe the distinction between the transcendence of God and the incarnation (God in immanence). Lastly, since God is a spirit, it is held that the Holy Spirit should not be understood as a separate entity but rather to describe God in action.

Modalistic Monarchianism is closely related to Sabellianism and Patripassianism, two ancient theologies condemned as heresy in the Great Church and successive state church of the Roman Empire.

History

Theologian and church historian Adolf von Harnack first used the term modalism to describe a doctrine believed in the late 2nd century and 3rd century. During this time period, Christian theologians were attempting to clarify the relationship between God the Father, the Son and the Holy Spirit. Concerned with defending the absolute unity of God, modalists such as Noetus, Praxeas, and Sabellius explained the divinity of Jesus Christ and the Holy Spirit as the one God revealing himself in different ways or modes: 
God revealed as the creator and lawgiver is called "the Father;"
God revealed as the savior in Jesus Christ is called "the Son;"
God revealed as the one who sanctifies and grants eternal life is called "the Spirit."

By the 4th century, a consensus had developed in favor of the doctrine of the Trinity, and modalism was generally considered a heresy.

With the advent of Pentecostalism, this revived theology developed into a central tenet of Oneness Pentecostalism. Oneness Pentecostals teach the divinity of Jesus and understand him to be a manifestation of Yahweh, the God of the Old Testament, in the flesh, and the Holy Spirit, or God in action. They also baptize solely in the name of Jesus or Jesus Christ; in this way, Father, Son, and Holy Spirit are considered titles pertaining to the one God, not descriptions of distinct individuals, and Jesus is seen as the one name for these titles.

Current adherents
Modalistic Monarchianism is accepted within Oneness Pentecostalism. Much of their theology attempts to begin with an Old Testament understanding of God in order to understand what the first apostles would have believed about Jesus. They also seek to avoid use of theological categories produced by Platonic-Aristotelian epistemologies, preferring rather to tell the story of redemption through narrative. Thus, the distinction found in the New Testament writers between God the Father and Jesus is understood to be from the attempts to identify God the Father and Jesus together, rather than to separate them more than necessary.

See also
 Names of God in Christianity
 Nontrinitarianism

References

Citations

Sources
 

Christology
Nontrinitarianism
Oneness Pentecostalism
Heresy in ancient Christianity
Nature of Jesus Christ